MK8 may refer to:

Mario Kart 8, a 2014 Wii U kart racing video game in the Mario Kart series
Kallikrein 8, an enzyme
Mitsubishi Kinsei (also MK8), a 14-cylinder, air-cooled, twin-row radial aircraft engine
Volkswagen Golf Mk8, the eighth generation of the Volkswagen Golf vehicle